The Albanian National Time Trial Championships have been held since 2002.

Multiple winners
Men

Men

U23

See also
Albanian National Road Race Championships
National road cycling championships

References

National road cycling championships
Cycle races in Albania
Recurring sporting events established in 2002
2002 establishments in Albania